Sabaskong Bay 35H is a First Nations reserve on Lake of the Woods in Ontario. It is one of the reserves of the Ojibways of Onigaming First Nation.

References

External links
 Canada Lands Survey System

Saulteaux reserves in Ontario
Communities in Rainy River District